Campbell Morfit (19 November 1820 – 8 December 1897) was a distinguished chemist from the United States, co-editor with James Curtis Booth of the Encyclopedia of Chemistry (1850).

Life
Morfit was born in Herculaneum, Missouri on 19 November 1820 and was educated at the Columbian University in Georgetown (Washington, D.C.).
Before graduating, he began to study chemistry in the laboratory of James C. Booth in Philadelphia.
He assisted Booth in development of a new method of refining gold, and in 1850 was assigned a share of the patent rights.
In 1853 he established a laboratory at Pikesville Arsenal in Maryland, where he investigated gun metal, co-authoring a report with James Booth on the subject for the United States Ordnance department.
He was the first teacher at the chemical department of the Maryland Institute, and from 1854 to 1858 was professor of applied chemistry there.
He then moved to New York City, where he continued to practice chemistry until emigrating to London in 1861.

Morfit was a fellow of the Chemical Society of London and the Institute of Chemistry. His principal works were Applied Chemistry in the Manufacture of Soaps and Candles (1847); Chemical and Pharmaceutical Manipulations (1848); A Report of the Progress of the Chemical Arts, prepared with Booth for the Smithsonian institution (1851); Perfumery, its Manufacture and Use (1852-5); Oleic Soaps (1871); and Mineral Phosphates (1873).
He and James Booth were co-editors of the Encyclopedia of Chemistry, and he wrote many other books and articles.
Morfit died in London on 8 December 1897.

Bibliography

References

External links
 

1820 births
1897 deaths
American chemists
People from Herculaneum, Missouri
Chemists from Missouri